Poland has a selection of gold and silver commemorative coins. In the year 1998 coins were launched in the series:  "Polish Kings and Princes", "Castles and Palaces of Poland", "The Animals of the World" and various occasional coins.

Coins produced

See also

 Numismatics
 Regular issue coinage
 Coin grading

References

Commemorative coins of Poland